Roman Dyboski (19 November 1883 in Cieszyn – 1 June 1945 in Kraków) was a Polish philologist and literature scholar. Professor at the Jagiellonian University since 1911. Member of the Polish Academy of Learning.

He was son of Antoni Dyboski and Maria Łopuszańska.

Publications 
 William Shakespeare. Krakowska Spółka Wydawnicza, 1927.
 O Anglji i Anglikach. Wyd. F. Hoesick, Warszawa, 1929.
 Knighthode and Bataile: A XVth Century Verse Paraphrase of Flavius Vegetius Renatus Treatise 'De Re Militari, Oxford (EETS), 1935.
 Między literaturą a życiem. 1936.
 Wielcy pisarze amerykańscy. Wyd. PAX, 1958.

Footnotes

External links 

 Tomasz Pudłocki, Idea uniwersytetu według Romana Dyboskiego, Rocznik Komisji Nauk Pedagogicznych. Tom LXIX 2016.

Polish literary historians
1883 births
1945 deaths
Academic staff of Jagiellonian University
Members of the Polish Academy of Learning
People from Cieszyn
Recipients of the Order of Polonia Restituta
Austro-Hungarian military personnel of World War I
Historians of English literature
English–Polish translators
Polish–English translators